The 1952 German motorcycle Grand Prix was the fifth round of the 1952 Grand Prix motorcycle racing season. It took place on 20 July 1952 at the Solitude circuit.

500 cc classification

350 cc classification

250 cc classification

125 cc classification

Sidecar classification

References

German motorcycle Grand Prix
German
German Motorcycle Grand Prix